C. & V. Hansen is the name used by the Danish couple Carla and Vilhelm Hansen to sign their Rasmus Klump comics (in English known as Bruin).

Biography
Vilhelm Hansen (May 6, 1900 – December 23, 1992) and Carla Hansen (September 19, 1906 – December 6, 2001) were an artistic couple. He was a trained lithographist, while she was a writer. Vilhelm worked mainly as an advertising artist between the two World Wars, and only started making comics and illustrating the tales written by Carla in the 1940s.

Their collaborative comic Rasmus Klump, about the adventures of a bear, a pelican, a penguin, and some other animals, debuted in Denmark on November 17, 1951, as a daily comic strip. It soon became one of the most popular European children comics, being translated and distributed into many languages and countries, mainly by the publishing houses Carlsen Comics and Casterman. While they no longer wrote or drew the stories after 1965, it was their names that stayed on the albums.

Bibliography
De Tidlige Børnebøger, a series of children books from the 1940s and 1950s illustrated by Vilhelm Hansen
Eventyr, a series of fairy tales written by Carla Hansen in the 1950s
Rasmus Klump, started in 1951: 36 comic albums and some accompanying books and illustrations

Awards
2002: Vilhelm Hansen is the subject of a Danish stamp

External links
Biography of Vilhelm Hansen
Artwork by Vilhelm Hansen (in Danish)
Fan site, with pictures of Carla and Vilhelm

Danish children's writers
Danish cartoonists
Danish comics artists